"Electric Youth" is a song by American singer-songwriter-actress Debbie Gibson, released as the second single from her second album, Electric Youth (1989). Produced by Fred Zarr and engineered by Phil Castellano for BiZarr Music, Inc. and released in 1989, it became one of her most famous songs, peaking at number eleven on the Billboard Hot 100 and fourteen on the UK Singles Chart. Douglas Breitbart was the single's executive producer.

Gibson had written the song as a statement about how young people of that era were seen and how their ideas were often ignored.  As a teenager herself, she was a firm believer that the beliefs and ideas held by young people were just as important as those held by adults and the song reminded people of this.  It also reminded them that the current youth would become the next generation of adults.

In 2012, Gibson re-recorded the song as "Electric Youth Reloaded", featuring arrangement and rap lyrics by Jace Hall.

Critical reception
Bryan Buss from AllMusic described the song as "a bouncy, frenetic song that is ridiculously sing-alongable, but at the same it is time hard to really identify with it unless you're 12 (or at least young at heart)." The Daily Vault's Christopher Thelen noted that it "capture the playfulness of Gibson's music and the carefree feeling of youth." Pop Rescue said it is "by far the best song" on the album.

Music video
The music video for the song was directed by Gibson and Jim Yukich and was nominated for a moonman at the 1989 MTV Video Music Awards for Best Art Direction in a video.

In 2006, elements of the music video (particularly the silhouette dance clips) were parodied by Cobie Smulders in the sitcom How I Met Your Mother for her character Robin Sparkles' own 1990s ("The 80's didn't come to Canada 'til like '93.") hit single, "Let's Go to the Mall."

Track listing
All songs are written by Deborah Gibson

Other Version
 7th Heaven Club Mix - 6:49

Charts

Weekly charts

Year-end charts

Certifications

References

External links
 
 

1989 singles
1989 songs
Debbie Gibson songs
Songs written by Debbie Gibson
Song recordings produced by Fred Zarr
Atlantic Records singles